Hermann von Stein may refer to:
Hermann von Stein (1854–1927), Prussian general of artillery and Prussian Minister of War
 (1859–1928), Bavarian General of the Artillery, see Battle of Caporetto